Power FM (call sign: 3BBA) is a commercial radio station in Ballarat, Victoria, Australia, broadcasting on the FM band at a frequency of 103.1 MHz. It serves listeners in Ballarat, Creswick, Maryborough, Ararat, Meredith, Daylesford, Ballan and surrounding areas. Together with its sister station 3BA, it is owned by ARN. According to a survey in late 2021, Power FM is the most listened-to radio station in Ballarat and holds a 28.1% share of the market.

Currently, the station airs a contemporary hit radio format, featuring music from the 1990s through to today's top 40 hits, aimed at an audience aged under 35. It also airs several syndicated radio programs including Top 40 Pop & Urban Chart Hits.

In June 2009, Power FM and Sovereign Hill attempted to "lure" the singer Pink, who was then on tour in Australia, to Ballarat, whilst also fundraising for the Ballarat Cancer Research Centre. Power FM was also temporarily renamed to "Pink FM." In November 2021, Power FM, along with other stations owned by Grant Broadcasters,wase acquired by the Australian Radio Network. This deal will allow Grant's stations, including Power FM, to access ARN's iHeartRadio platform in regional areas. The deal was finalized on January 4, 2022. It is expected Power FM 103.1 will integrate with ARN's KIIS Network, but will retain its current name according to the press release from ARN.

In September 2022, Power FM Brekkie co-host Julie "Jules" Zass resigned after being a host on the station since February 2, 2009, to focus on family life and her new daughter. She was previously a host on Melbourne radio station SYN.

On-air schedule

Weekdays 
 12:00am–6:00am - Your Hit Music Station
 6:00am–10:00am - Power FM Brekkie 
 10:00am–2:00pm - Workday Hits 
 2:00pm–6:00pm - The Home Run
 6:00pm–7:00pm - Your Hit Music Station  
 7:00pm–8:00pm - The Kyle and Jackie O Hour of Power
 8:00pm–10:00pm - The Random 20 with Mikey
 10:00pm–12:00am - Oz Made

Weekends 
 12:00am–12:00am - Your Hit Music Station

See also 
 List of radio stations in Australia

References

External links 
 Official website

Radio stations in Ballarat
Contemporary hit radio stations in Australia
Australian Radio Network